The  Institut de Formation Artistique in is an art school in Mbalmayo, Cameroon.

References 

Schools in Cameroon
Art schools